Olathe High School may refer to Olathe North High School, which was originally Olathe High School.

Other schools in Olathe:
 Olathe East High School, West 127th Street, Olathe, Kansas
 Olathe Northwest High School, College Blvd, Olathe, Kansas
 Olathe South High School, East 151st Street, Olathe, Kansas
 Olathe West High School, West Santa Fe Street, Olathe, Kansas